The blotched sandskate (Psammobatis bergi) is a species of fish in the family Arhynchobatidae. It is found off the coasts of Argentina, Brazil, and Uruguay. And sometimes in Norway. Its natural habitat is open seas.

References

Psammobatis
Taxonomy articles created by Polbot
Fish described in 1932